Claig Castle was a stronghold of the Clan Donald or MacDonald in the south of Scotland.

History
The castle was once a massive fort described as a sea fortress, which allowed the Macdonald Lord of the Isles to dominate and control the sea traffic north and south through the Hebrides for more than four centuries.

The castle remained a stronghold of the MacDonalds until they were subdued in the 17th century by the Clan Campbell.

Location

See also
Castles in Scotland A list of Scottish castles.
Clan Donald

External links
Am Fraoch Eilean, Claig Castle

Castles in Argyll and Bute
Category C listed buildings in Argyll and Bute
Listed castles in Scotland